Ercheia designata is a species of moth of the family Erebidae. It is found in New Guinea.

References

Moths described in 1914
Ercheiini
Moths of New Guinea